Sigurd Andersen (2 January 1903 – 23 June 1962) was a Norwegian footballer. He played in three matches for the Norway national football team in 1928.

References

External links
 

1903 births
1962 deaths
Norwegian footballers
Norway international footballers
Place of birth missing
Association football forwards
Mjøndalen IF players